Sidney Armus (December 19, 1924 – June 21, 2002) was an American actor.  

Born in the Bronx, New York, he made his Broadway debut in the original production of the musical South Pacific in 1949. Prior to that he spent six months in England playing the role of "Stefanowski" in the London company of Mister Roberts, which starred Tyrone Power. Armus appeared in many off-Broadway productions in New York before his debut.  

While studying with Erwin Piscator at the Dramatic Workshop of The New School for Social Research, he was seen in 'The Flies,' 'There is No End,' and 'Crew 55' (sourced from the original theatre program for 'South Pacific', 1949.)

Sidney played the character of "Itchy" Flexner, the social director, in the Broadway production of the musical comedy Wish You Were Here which opened at the Imperial Theatre on June 25, 1952, and closed on November 28, 1953, after 598 performances. Wish You Were Here is a musical with a book by Arthur Kober and Joshua Logan and music and lyrics by Harold Rome. The musical was adapted from Kober's 1937 play, Having Wonderful Time, and revolves around a summer camp for adults.

Other Broadway productions Sidney appeared in on Broadway were "The Flowering Peach" (1954), "The Cold and the Warm" (1958) with Suzanne Pleshette and Maureen Stapleton, and "Harold" (1962).

In films, Armus had memorable roles in Sleepless in Seattle, One Fine Day, Postcards from the Edge, and The Thomas Crown Affair. In television he appeared on Columbo, Kojak, and The Defenders, as well as many 1950s early television dramas such as Goodyear Playhouse and The United States Steel Hour. 

In the early 90s, Armus appeared in several Law & Order episodes playing various judges.

In his later career he owned and operated Theatre 22, an Off-Off-Broadway theater in New York City, where he directed plays.

He died in Manhattan, New York of cancer.

References

External links

1924 births
2002 deaths
American male stage actors
Entertainers from the Bronx
20th-century American male actors
Male actors from New York City